The Boulder River is a tributary of the Yellowstone River, approximately  60 mi (96 km) long, in south central Montana in the United States. It is one of two rivers named the Boulder River in Montana.

It rises in the Gallatin National Forest in the Absaroka Range in southern Park County. It flows north through mountainous canyons, a cataract under a natural bridge, and northwest in a widening valley past McLeod. It joins the Yellowstone at Big Timber.  The landscape of the Boulder River and river valley has merited the filming of two movies:  A River Runs Through It and The Horse Whisperer.

Discharges

Tourism
The river is a popular destination for fly fishing.  Other attractions in the valley include several church camps, a guest ranch, and several USFS campgrounds.  The Forest Service also maintains several guard stations, trailheads, and picnic areas in the valley.

Variant names
The Boulder River has also been known as: Rivers a Cross, Rivers across, and Rivers-across. And, to distinguish it from the other Boulder River in Montana, it is sometimes called the "East Boulder River" (as it is east of the other) or the "Boulder Fork of the Yellowstone," parallel with the Clark's Fork of the Yellowstone as differentiated from the Clark's Fork River of Western Montana.

See also

List of rivers of Montana
Montana Stream Access Law

References

Rivers of Montana
Rivers of Park County, Montana
Bodies of water of Sweet Grass County, Montana
Tributaries of the Yellowstone River